is a cover album by Puffy AmiYumi (stylized as PUFFY). Released by Epic Records on February 20, 2002, the album features covers of hits from the 1970s and 1980s. The album peaked at No. 10 on Oricon's weekly albums chart.

Track listing

Charts

References

External links
 
 

Puffy AmiYumi albums
2002 albums
Covers albums
Japanese-language albums
Sony Music Entertainment Japan albums